Jean-François Bertrand is a former Canadian politician in Quebec, Canada. Bertrand served in the National Assembly of Quebec.

Background

He was born on June 22, 1946 in Cowansville, Quebec and has a degree in political science from Université Laval.  He is the son of politicians Jean-Jacques and Gabrielle Bertrand.

Political career

Member of the legislature

Bertrand became an executive member of the Parti Québécois in 1974 and was elected to the National Assembly of Quebec in the 1976 election. He served as parliamentary assistant and Deputy House Leader from 1978 to the 1981 election.

He was re-elected in 1981 and was appointed to Premier René Lévesque's Cabinet. He served as Minister of Communications, until his defeat in the 1985 election. He also was the government's House Leader from 1982 to 1984.

Mayoral election

Bertrand was the Progrès Civique de Québec candidate for mayor in Quebec City in 1989. He lost against Rassemblement Populaire candidate Jean-Paul L'Allier.

Federal politics

Bertrand ran as a Bloc Québécois candidate in a 1995 by-election in the federal district of Brome—Missisquoi. He lost against Liberal candidate Denis Paradis.

Retirement

He authored and published Je suis un bum de bonne famille in 2003. The book revealed that he has a drug addiction.

Electoral record
Federal

Footnotes

1946 births
French Quebecers
Living people
Parti Québécois MNAs
Bloc Québécois candidates for the Canadian House of Commons
People from Cowansville
Université Laval alumni
Academic staff of Université Laval